Maouhoub Ghazouani (born 1946) is a Moroccan football midfielder who played for Morocco in the 1970 FIFA World Cup. He scored a goal versus Bulgaria in a 1-1 draw. Morocco therefore became the first African team to avoid defeat in the World Cup. He also played for FAR Rabat.

References

1946 births
Moroccan footballers
Footballers from Casablanca
Morocco international footballers
Association football midfielders
AS FAR (football) players
Botola players
Competitors at the 1967 Mediterranean Games
1970 FIFA World Cup players
1972 African Cup of Nations players
Footballers at the 1972 Summer Olympics
Olympic footballers of Morocco
Living people
Mediterranean Games competitors for Morocco